Assens railway station was the terminus of the Tommerup-Assens railway line, connecting the town of Assens with the Funen Main Line on the island of Funen in central Denmark.

History and design
The station opened along with the other stations on the Tommerup-Assens line in 1884. It was built to a design by Niels Peder Christian Holsøe who had become head architect of the Danish State Railways in 1880. Prior to his appointment, Holsøe had developed a standardized building, consisting of a high central section flanked by two lower shoulders, in a romanticizing Neo-Romanesque style. This design was introduced with the construction of Strib railway station in 1860. At Assens, it was expanded with two low towers in Italian style. Holsøe also designed a new post office which was built next to the station.

The station came out of use when the Tommerup–Assens line was closed to passenger traffic in 1965.

References

External links

Disused railway stations in Denmark
Listed buildings and structures in Assens Municipality
Listed railway stations in Denmark
Railway stations opened in 1884
Railway stations closed in 1965
Railway stations in Denmark opened in the 19th century